Man Camp is a 2019 American comedy film directed by Nate Bakke, starring Daniel Cummings, Scott Kruse, Erik Stocklin, Tammy Kaitz and Pete Gardner.

Cast
 Daniel Cummings as Adam Mann
 Scott Kruse as Tim Mann
 Erik Stocklin as Kevin Mann
 Tammy Kaitz as Theresa Mann
 Pete Gardner as Alan
 Raleigh Cain as Christy Borders
 Anna Rubley as Katie Mann

Release
The film was released on several streaming services on 21 April 2020.

Reception
Michael Walsh of Nerdist gave the film a rating of 3.5/5 and called it a "well-acted comedy that also doubles as a touching family story about grief, growing up, and moving on."

Alan Ng of Film Threat gave the film a score of 6.5/10 and wrote that while he found the comedy "humorous", it was "rarely laugh out loud funny".

Allen Adams of The Maine Edge called the film a "shaggy, silly good time that also offers a surprising amount of heart."

References

External links
 
 

American comedy films
2019 comedy films